The second USS Tillamook (SP-269), later USS SP-269, was a United States Navy patrol vessel in commission from 1917 to 1919.

Tillamook was built as a civilian motorboat or motor yacht of the same name in 1911 by the Matthews Boat Company at Port Clinton, Ohio. The U.S. Navy purchased her from her owner, Mr. D. C. Whitney of Detroit, Michigan, on 14 May 1917 for World War I service as a patrol vessel. She was commissioned on 1 June 1917 as USS Tillamook (SP-269), although some sources claim that she was commissioned as USS SP-269 rather than under her civilian name.

Assigned to the 9th Naval District—at the time functioning as part of a single administrative entity known as the "9th, 10th, and 11 Naval Districts" -- Tillamook patrolled the waters of Lake Michigan. According to some sources her name change to USS SP-269 occurred during this time, early in 1918. Whenever her name change occurred, it was to avoid confusion between her and the tug USS Tillamook (Tug No. 16), which was in commission at the same time. Despite her name change, official papers often continued to refer to her as Tillamook (SP-269), particularly those regarding her disposal in 1919.

SP-269 remained active in the 9th Naval District until the autumn of 1919.  She was sold to Mr. George Jerome of Detroit on 20 November 1919.

Notes

References

Department of the Navy: Navy History and Heritage Command: Online Library of Selected Images: Civilian Ships: Tillamook (American Motor Boat, 1911). Served in 1917-1919 as USS Tillamook (SP-269) and USS SP-269
NavSource Online: Section Patrol Craft Photo Archive: SP-269 ex-Tillamook (SP 269)

Patrol vessels of the United States Navy
World War I patrol vessels of the United States
Individual yachts
Ships built in Port Clinton, Ohio
1911 ships